Advances in Theoretical and Mathematical Physics (ATMP) is a peer-reviewed,  mathematics journal,  published by International Press.
Established in 1997, the journal publishes articles on theoretical physics and mathematics.

The current managing editors are Charles Doran, Babak Haghighat, Junya Yagi and Hossein Yavartanoo.

Abstracting, indexing, and reviews
This journal is indexed in the following databases:
Science Citation Index Expanded
MathSciNet – also reviews this journal
Current Contents: Physical, Chemical & Earth Sciences
Zentralblatt MATH

External links

Mathematics journals
Publications established in 1997
English-language journals
International Press academic journals
Bimonthly journals